The Albany Metro Mallers are a semi-professional football team. The team has regularly appeared in national semipro playoffs and won the national semipro title in 2008, 2013, and 2016. Some of the team's players have gone on to play professional football.

The Mallers currently play in the World Football Federation, a league based in the Northeast. The Mallers finished the 2017 season, which included a trip to Florida for the USFA Semi Pro National Championship Game, with a 12-2 record.

Team history

The Seaboard League: NFL castoffs trying to make it back
After the team's first year in 1972, the Mallers moved into the Seaboard Football League in 1973, which had teams in New York, New Jersey, Pennsylvania and Maryland.  They played their home games in Schenectady, New York, that year.  Unlike most semipro leagues, which had only local players and did not pay their players, the Seaboard League teams brought in players from outside their areas, paid their players modestly and helped them find local jobs. League teams were able to attract numerous players who had been signed to NFL contracts, had been cut in the preseason, and were hoping to make the NFL eventually.  More than ten of the Mallers had been in NFL camps. Later in the season, the team made an informal arrangement with the Montreal Alouettes of the Canadian Football League to develop players for the Alouettes who had been released by that team.,  Three of the players on the 1973 Mallers (Bill Ellenbogen, Don Aleksiewicz and Gary Weinlein) played professional football eventually, although none ever played for the Alouettes.

Becoming amateurs
The Seaboard Football League folded at the end of that season, and the team joined the Empire Football League, a league with teams primarily located in Upstate New York that prohibited paying their players. The Mallers moved to Albany that year. They finished second in the league in 1975 and 1976, and won the league championship in 1979.

In 1981, the team moved into the Eastern Football League, which had teams in Massachusetts and in New York State.  The Mallers won the league championship, 12–9, on a 73-yard flea flicker touchdown pass thrown by wide receiver Mike DeCarlo that was deflected by a defender into the hands of wide receiver Davey Williams, who held on to it and then ran the remaining 50 yards into the end zone.

The Mallers also won the Eastern Football League championship in 1986, defeating the Marlboro Shamrocks, 23–14. The Metro Mallers returned to the Empire Football League in 1987, and finished second in the league that year.  They won the league championship in 1989, and finished second in the league in 1990.

NFL players' strike: Some Mallers become replacements
In 1987, during the NFL players' strike, three members of the team were signed to play on NFL replacement teams (Dana Melvin, Robbin Williams and Joe Burke). Only running back Joe Burke, who had been named the 1986 American Football Association Player of the Year as the best semipro football player in the country, saw actual playing time, however. Burke returned to the Mallers in time to play in the American Football Association national playoffs in November 1987.  The Mallers also were in the national playoffs in 1991, losing to the eventual national champion Brooklyn Mariners, 12–6.

2004 to present: Regional and national success
The Mallers finished second in the Empire Football League in 2004, and won the league in 2005 and 2006. In 2006 they won the United States Football Alliance (USFA) Eastern Championship.

In 2007, the team again changed leagues, moving into the North American Football League. They won the Empire Division in their first year in that league.

In 2008, the Mallers were named as the USFA and Minor League Football News (MLFN) National Champions.
In 2011, the Mallers returned to the Empire Football League and captured the EFL title with a 26–14 victory against the Syracuse Shock.  In 2013, the Mallers joined SPF-The League, a western NY-based league.  The Mallers defeated the S. Buffalo Celtics to win the league title and win the USFA/USFF National title after travelling to Racine, Wisconsin, and beating the host Raiders, 26–14.  In 2014, the Mallers moved to the Gridiron Developmental Football League.

In 2015, the Albany Metro Mallers moved to the World Football Federation. The Mallers won the first inaugural WFF Championship Game by defeating the Central Penn Piranhas 16-6.

In 2016, the Albany Metro Mallers would play for the National Championship in DeLand, Florida vs. Midwest (MO) Chargers. They went on to win 38-6, and became the 2016 National Champions. 

In 2017, the Albany Metro Mallers would play for the National Championship once again, in DeLand, Florida at Stetson University vs. PAFL (Premier Amateur Football League) Champions Columbus (OH) Fire. The Mallers lost 13-6.

Scott Lawson, record-breaking quarterback
Quarterback Scott Lawson, who has been with the Mallers since 1990, broke the all-time semipro football record for the most touchdown passes in a career when he threw his 379th touchdown pass on October 4, 2008, against the Troy Fighting Irish.  He has continued to play, and as of the end of the 2009 season, he had increased his record to 415 touchdown passes.

List Of Albany Metro Mallers Championships

USFA National Champions (2008, 2013, 2016)
EFL (Empire Football League) Champions (1979, 1989, 2005, 2006, 2011)
EFL (Eastern Football League) Champions (1981, 1986)
NAFL Empire Champions (2007, 2009)
USFA Eastern Region Champions (2006, 2016, 2017)
World Football Federation Champions (2015)
SPF "The League" Champions (2013)

Metro Mallers that have played professional football
The following Metro Mallers players played during the regular season for professional teams:

Metro Mallers who are among the all-time semipro record holders

Scoring records

Passing records

Rushing records

Miscellaneous records

See also
 Sports in New York's Capital District

References

External links
 United States Football Alliance

Sports in Albany, New York
Semi-professional American football
American football teams in New York (state)